Hernán Boher (born 12 June 1940) is a Chilean alpine skier. He competed at the 1960 Winter Olympics and the 1964 Winter Olympics.

References

1940 births
Living people
Chilean male alpine skiers
Olympic alpine skiers of Chile
Alpine skiers at the 1960 Winter Olympics
Alpine skiers at the 1964 Winter Olympics
Sportspeople from Santiago
20th-century Chilean people